Puls 8 is a privately owned TV channel in German-speaking Switzerland, owned by the German media group ProSiebenSat.1 Media. The channel is based on the concept of Puls 4 in Austria, and it had started its broadcast on 8 October 2015 at 8pm. Its first program were the movie Star Trek.

The name of the channel refers to the start of the primetime at 8 pm.

Programming

Awake (2018)
Beauty and the Beast (2016–present)
Eureka (EUReKA - Die geheime Stadt) (2017–present)
JAG (J.A.G. - Im Auftrag der Ehre) (2016–present)
Rosewood (2017–present)
Scream Queens (2017-2018)
Second Chance (2018)
The Defenders (2016)
The Simpsons (Die Simpsons) (2015-2017)
Touch (2016)

References

External links
 

Television stations in Switzerland
Television channels and stations established in 2015
2015 establishments in Switzerland
German-language television stations
ProSiebenSat.1 Media
Mass media in Zürich